833 Naval Air Squadron (833 NAS) was a Naval Air Squadron of the Royal Navy's Fleet Air Arm.

References

800 series Fleet Air Arm squadrons
Military units and formations established in 1941
Military units and formations of the Royal Navy in World War II